Clarenceux King of Arms, historically often spelled Clarencieux (both pronounced  ), is an officer of arms at the College of Arms in London.  Clarenceux is the senior of the two provincial kings of arms and his jurisdiction is that part of England south of the River Trent.  The office almost certainly existed in 1420, and there is a fair degree of probability that there was a Claroncell rex heraldus armorum in 1334.  There are also some early references to the southern part of England being termed Surroy, but there is not firm evidence that there was ever a king of arms so called.  The title of Clarenceux is supposedly derived from either the Honour (or estates of dominion) of the Clare earls of Gloucester, or from the Dukedom of Clarence (1362).  With minor variations, the arms of Clarenceux have, from the late fifteenth century, been blazoned as Argent a Cross on a Chief Gules a Lion passant guardant crowned with an open Crown Or.

Timothy Duke was appointed Clarenceux King of Arms on 1 April 2021.

Holders of the office
Brackets indicate a date for which there is evidence the named person held this office

See also

Heraldry
Officer of Arms

References
Notes

Citations

Bibliography
 The College of Arms, Queen Victoria Street : being the sixteenth and final monograph of the London Survey Committee, Walter H. Godfrey, assisted by Sir Anthony Wagner, with a complete list of the officers of arms, prepared by H. Stanford London, (London, 1963)
 A History of the College of Arms &c, Mark Noble, (London, 1804)

External links
 The College of Arms
CUHGS Officer of Arms Index

Offices of the College of Arms